Matt Wilson (born May 8, 1985) is an American professional stock car racing driver. He competes part-time in the ARCA Menards Series,  driving the No. 7 Chevrolet for CCM Racing.

Racing career

ARCA Menards Series East 
Wilson made his ARCA Menards Series East debut in 2022 at the Nashville Fairgrounds Speedway. He will be running the No. 22 Chevrolet SS for CCM Racing. However, a mix-up occurred which the No. 22 withdrew, meaning Matt will drive the No. 10 for Fast Track with CCM as Tony Cosentino will replace Tim Monroe in the No. 12.

ARCA Menards Series 
Wilson made his ARCA Menards Series debut in the 2022 General Tire 150 at Charlotte Motor Speedway, finishing 12th.

Motorsports career results

ARCA Menards Series 
(key) (Bold – Pole position awarded by qualifying time. Italics – Pole position earned by points standings or practice time. * – Most laps led. ** – All laps led.)

ARCA Menards Series East

References

External links 

Living people
ARCA Menards Series drivers
NASCAR drivers
Racing drivers from Arkansas
1985 births